Boondi is an Indian snack made from fried chickpea flour, either as a savory snack or sweetened as a dessert.  

In Sindh and Rajasthan, the dish is called nukti (Dhatki: نڪتي | नुक्ती). In Nepali it is referred to as buniya (बुनिया). In Bihar it is called bundiya (बुंदिया).

Preparation 

To make the crispy savory snack, chickpea flour, baking powder, and turmeric are mixed into a batter. A slotted spoon is used to pour small drops into a deep frying pan. The boondi is then soaked in sugar syrup. Crushed curry leaves are added. Khara boondi is eaten by itself or is added to Indian-mixture.

Variations 
Boondi is popularly used to prepare raita in  North India. Boondi raita typically contains curd (plain yoghurt), boondi (which has been soaked in water to make it soft, then sieved) and seasonings of salt, chilli, and other spices. It is eaten as a side dish with pulao or any other meal.

To make boondi laddu, fried boondi is dipped in sugar syrup and compacted into a ball. It can be garnished with nuts and raisins.

References

External links

Indian snack foods
Indian fast food
Deep fried foods
Rajasthani cuisine
Chickpea dishes
Sindhi cuisine
Bengali desserts
Bangladeshi desserts